Groß Sankt Florian is a municipality in the district of Deutschlandsberg in the Austrian state of Styria.

Geography
It is located in southern Austria, near Slovenia and is approximately 35 km from Graz.

Population

Sights
Popular tourist attractions in the area include a Romanesque church from the 11th century and a museum of fire protection.

References

External links
 
Music orchestra

Cities and towns in Deutschlandsberg District